Taylor McNamara may refer:

 Taylor McNamara (American football), American football player
 Taylor McNamara (soccer), Canadian soccer player